The Hey Cruel World...Tour, by American rock band Marilyn Manson, supported their eighth full-length studio LP, 2012's Born Villain. The band's thirteenth tour was their ninth to spread over multiple legs, spanning North America, South America, Europe, Asia and Oceania. The tour was named after the opening song of the album.

Rumors about the tour's itinerary began as early as June 3, 2011, when the Brazilian edition of Portuguese broadsheet newspaper Destak published that agents for the band had finalized negotiations for the group to tour Brazil and other South American countries as part of the SWU Music & Arts Festival in November 2011. Despite this, the band's supposed inclusion in the roster failed to materialize.

The tour's 2012 itinerary was confirmed in October 2011 to include an Australian leg from late February to early March as part of the 5-day 2012 Soundwave music festival. After the Australian leg the tour continued to Asia, North America and Europe, including Manson's first performances in the United States since mid-2009.

"We had to get our fuck on…" Manson told Kerrang! when the tour hit the UK. "That's an American term. We've been playing a lot of Antichrist Superstar – stuff that makes us happiest. In turn, that'll make the audience happier. [Of the newer songs] I love playing 'Pistol Whipped', because I play guitar like a complete asshole."

Set list
{{hidden
| header = Australia Leg
| headercss = text-align:left;
| toggle = left
| content = * "Track 99" served as the intro for the tour.
 "Antichrist Superstar" 
 "Disposable Teens" 
 "The Love Song" 
 "Little Horn" 
 "The Dope Show" 
 "Rock Is Dead" 
 "Personal Jesus" 
 "mOBSCENE"
 "Sweet Dreams (Are Made of This)" 
 "Irresponsible Hate Anthem" 
Encore
"The Beautiful People" (with "Baby, You're a Rich Man" intro)
}}
{{hidden
| header = Asia Leg
| headercss = text-align:left;
| toggle = left
| content = * "The WASP (Texas Radio and the Big Beat)" served as the intro for the tour.
 "Antichrist Superstar" 
 "Disposable Teens" 
 "The Love Song" 
 "Little Horn" 
 "The Dope Show" 
 "Rock Is Dead" 
 "Tourniquet" 
 "Personal Jesus" 
 "mOBSCENE" 
 "Sweet Dreams (Are Made of This)" 
 "Irresponsible Hate Anthem" 
Encore
"Coma White" 
"1996 (Spoken Verses)" 
"The Beautiful People" (with "Baby, You're a Rich Man" intro)
}}

{{hidden
| header =  North America Leg #1, #2 & Europe Leg #1
| headercss = text-align:left;
| toggle = left
| content = * "Suspiria" served as the intro for the tour.
 "Hey Cruel World" 
 "Disposable Teens" 
 "The Love Song" 
 "No Reflection" 
 "mOBSCENE" 
 "The Dope Show" (with "Diary of a Dope Friend" intro)
 "Slo-Mo-Tion" 
 "Rock Is Dead" 
 "Personal Jesus" 
 "Pistol Whipped" 
 "Tourniquet" 
 "Coma White" (with "Coma Black" intro)
 "Irresponsible Hate Anthem" 
 "Sweet Dreams (Are Made of This)
Encore
"Antichrist Superstar" 
"The Beautiful People" (with "Baby You're a Rich Man" intro)
"Murderers Are Getting Prettier Every Day (only performed in St. Petersburg)
 "You're So Vain" served as the outro for the tour.
}}
{{hidden
| header = Twins Of Evil Tour (North America & Europe)
| headercss = text-align:left;
| toggle = left
| content = * "Suspiria" served as the intro for the tour.
 "Hey Cruel World" 
 "Disposable Teens" 
 "The Love Song" 
 "No Reflection" 
 "mOBSCENE" 
 "The Dope Show" (with "Happiness Is a Warm Gun" intro)
 "Slo-Mo-Tion" 
 "Murderers Are Getting Prettier Every Day" (only in selected dates for North America)
 "Rock Is Dead" 
 "Personal Jesus" 
 "The Reflecting God" (only in selected dates for North America)
 "Tourniquet" (only in selected dates for North America)
 "Sweet Dreams (Are Made of This) (with "The Reflecting God" outro)
 "Coma White/Coma Black" 
 "King Kill 33º" 
 "Antichrist Superstar" 
Encore
"The Beautiful People"
 "You're So Vain" served as the outro for the tour.
}}

{{hidden
| header = South America
| headercss = text-align:left;
| toggle = left
| content = * "Suspiria" served as the intro for the tour.
 "Hey Cruel World" 
 "Disposable Teens" 
 "The Love Song" 
 "No Reflection" 
 "mOBSCENE" 
 "The Dope Show" (with "Happiness Is a Warm Gun" intro)
 "Slo-Mo-Tion" 
 "Rock Is Dead" 
 "Personal Jesus" 
 "Sweet Dreams (Are Made of This) 
 "Coma White" 
 "King Kill 33º" 
 "Antichrist Superstar" 
Encore
"The Beautiful People"
 "You're So Vain" served as the outro for the tour.
}}

{{hidden
| header = Europe, Leg #3
| headercss = text-align:left;
| toggle = left
| content = * "Suspiria" served as the intro for the tour.
 "Hey Cruel World" 
 "Disposable Teens" 
 "The Love Song" 
 "No Reflection" 
 "mOBSCENE" 
 "The Dope Show" 
 "Slo-Mo-Tion" 
 "Rock Is Dead" 
 "Personal Jesus" 
 "The Last Day on Earth" (Only performed in Ukraine & Belarus)
 "Sweet Dreams (Are Made of This)
 "Coma White" 
 "King Kill 33º" 
 "Antichrist Superstar" 
Encore
"The Beautiful People"
"Irresponsible Hate Anthem" (Only performed in Moscow, Ukraine & Belarus)
 "You're So Vain" served as the outro for the tour.
}}

Broadcasts & Recordings
Manson's set was recorded at the ROCK AM RING festival in Germany on 1 June 2012, but only three song performances (Hey Cruel World, Personal Jesus and Antichrist Superstar) have emerged online.

A video album has been in the works since 2007, with footage recorded at all tours since that time. It is unknown if the Hey Cruel World... Tour is included in this project or if the project has been cancelled owing to Manson's split from Interscope.

Twins Of Evil

The Hey Cruel World... Tour featured a 'tour within a tour': the Twins of Evil Tour, a double bill coheadlined by Rob Zombie and Manson. Supporting each act's respective albums – 2010's Hellbilly Deluxe 2 and Born Villain – the tour visited arenas from September 28, 2012 through December 12, 2012. It was conceived as a follow-up to Zombie's Hellbilly Deluxe 2 World Tour and consisted of two legs, covering the United States and Europe.

In an interview with Kerrang, Manson shared his desire to record a live album on the Twins of Evil Tour. He noted the enthusiastic audience reaction, his satisfaction with the band lineup and "the way things sound live now."

Lineup
Marilyn Manson: Vocals, additional guitar
Twiggy Ramirez: Guitar, bass, backing vocals
Fred Sablan: Bass
Jason Sutter: Drums

Tour dates 

  Headline shows, non Soundwave Festival dates.
  Headline show, non Maquinaria Festival date.

Cancelled or rescheduled shows

Box office score data

Headlining shows

Festivals

References

Marilyn Manson (band) concert tours
2012 concert tours